Trier Hauptbahnhof is a railway station for the city of Trier, in the German state of Rhineland-Palatinate.

History
The station was opened in  together with the rest of the Moselle line, which formed part of the Kanonenbahn (Berlin–Metz).

Earlier, upon the opening of the Saar route in 1860, Trier had acquired a station on the left bank of the Moselle, the present day Trier-West station, which, in 1871, had also been linked with Cologne via the Eifel Railway.  However, in view of its convenient location close to Trier's city centre, the present day Hauptbahnhof soon became the city's most important station.

Station facilities

Building and platforms
The main entrance of the station leads directly to the station lobby. In the southwestern part of the lobby, there are a FotoFix automat and two pay phones; in the southern half (with its own access) are luggage lockers, ticket machines, the toilet and the DB travel centre. In the north-west wing is a candy kiosk and in the eastern half an ATM, a bakery / café and a newsagent.

In 2005, renovation work began in the station area with the objective of adapting it to the standard of other ICE-train stations.

On the platforms, dimpled paving stones suitable for blind travellers have been placed near the platform edges to mark their borders.
The station building has been renovated and converted into (a new cafe moved in and the newspaper shop was enlarged and moved).
Elevators were installed to give barrier-free access to the platforms.
The City Council also decided to redesign and refresh the station district over the next few years.

Forecourt and surroundings
The station forecourt is overwhelmingly dominated by retail outlets.  At the southern end, it is bordered by the Alleencenter shopping centre.  An expert workshop organised by the city of Trier has put forward comprehensive plans for the redevelopment of the station forecourt, and in particular for the reorganisation of the parking and traffic control systems.  Under these plans, there would be a generally clearly visible station building, with a new bus terminal, and either an overpass or underpass to Trier-Gartenfeld.

Road connections
Trief Hbf is connected to its west, via the Bahnhofstrasse with the Alleenring, which gathers together all the traffic from the Ost- and Theodor-Heuss-Allee, Christoph- und Balduinstraße, as well as the streets in the Reichsabtei.

The forecourt in front of the main building offers short-term parking and parking for motorcycles. Further parking can be found at the western end of the building and in the parking garage to the south of the Ostalleencenter.

Traffic

At Trier Hbf, more than 170 trains stop daily.  The trains calling at Trier include RE and RB services.

One can arrive in Trier from:
 Köln–Gerolstein via the Eifel Railway (KBS 474);
 Koblenz–Wittlich via the Koblenz–Trier line (KBS 690);
 Saarbrücken via the Saarbrücken–Trier line (KBS 685);
 Perl via the Thionville–Trier line (KBS 692); and
 Luxembourg via the Mosel-Syre Valley route (KBS 693).

Both of these last two railways merge with the Saar Railway in Konz.

Long distance traffic 

From Trier, IC trains formerly operated every two hours via Koblenz, Andernach, Bonn, Köln, Düsseldorf, Oberhausen, Münster (Westf) and Rheine to Emden/Norddeich Mole, and every two hours from Emden/Norddeich-Mole on the same itinerary in reverse, then onwards to Luxembourg. After the timetable change for 2005, Trier had an ICE connection with Berlin, by an ICE train that started its journey at the Trier Hauptbahnhof. That ICE train operated via Koblenz, Andernach, Bonn  (the Linke Rheinstrecke), Köln, Wuppertal, Hamm and Hannover.

In November 2011, ICE services were discontinued and long-distance services were reduced to only two IC trains per day on the line. These services ended on 13 December 2014 with the introduction of the Rhineland-Palatinate integrated regular interval service (Rheinland-Pfalz-Taktes 2015) on the line.

Regional traffic

Bus traffic
In the evenings and on weekends, Trier Hbf is the focal point of Trier's bus traffic. Each district of Trier can be reached from there without any need to change buses.

Gallery

References

External links 

 Track plan of Trier Hbf on the Deutsche Bahn website (PDF; 224,0 KB).

This article is based upon a translation of the German language version as at December 2010.

Trier
Railway stations in Germany opened in 1878
Buildings and structures in Trier